Mount Rosenthal is a prominent mountain, 1,840 m, at the north end of Liberty Hills, in the Heritage Range, Ellsworth Mountains. Named by Advisory Committee on Antarctic Names (US-ACAN) for Lieutenant Commander Ronald Rosenthal, U.S. Navy, navigator on LC-47 aircraft, who perished in a crash on the Ross Ice Shelf, February 2, 1966.

See also
 Mountains in Antarctica

References
 

Ellsworth Mountains
Mountains of Ellsworth Land